Major-General Cyril Ernest Napier Lomax,  (28 June 1893 – 30 August 1973) was an officer in the British Army during the First World War and Second World War. During the latter he commanded the 16th Infantry Brigade in North Africa and the Middle East, and later commanded the 26th Indian Infantry Division in the Burma Campaign, gaining the approval of Field Marshal Sir William Slim.

Early life and First World War
Born in Kings Norton, Worcestershire, on 28 June 1893, the eldest of three sons of Daniel Alexander Napier Lomax and Emma Annette Morris, Cyril Lomax was educated at Marlborough College. He attended the Royal Military College, Sandhurst and was commissioned as a second lieutenant into the Welch Regiment in September 1912. He was posted to the regiment's 2nd Battalion, then serving in Bordon, Hampshire, as part of the 3rd Brigade, part of Major-General Samuel Lomax's 1st Division.

Shortly after the First World War began in August 1914 (see British entry into World War I) Lomax's battalion, along with the rest of the division, was sent to France, arriving at Le Havre on 14 August. He was promoted to lieutenant on 1 November 1914, and served with his battalion throughout 1915 and 1916.

In August 1916, by which time he had been awarded the Military Cross, Lomax was appointed second in command of the 20th (Service) Battalion, Manchester Regiment, a Kitchener's Army unit, with the rank of temporary major. He was promoted to temporary lieutenant colonel in June 1917 to command the battalion. He was mentioned in despatches five times throughout the war.

Between the wars
Having been awarded the Distinguished Service Order during his period in command, Lomax left the 21st Battalion of the Manchester Regiment in June 1919 and reverted from the temporary rank of lieutenant colonel to his substantive rank of captain. In December 1919 he was appointed adjutant of the Welch Regiment.

In April 1923, Lomax relinquished his appointment as adjutant of the 3rd Battalion, and returned to his regiment. In March 1924 he was appointed adjutant of the 6th Battalion, The Welch Regiment. In March 1928 Lomax finished his spell as adjutant of the 6th Battalion, The Welch Regiment.

In November 1932, Lomax was promoted to major and in January 1935 he was made a brevet lieutenant colonel. He was promoted to lieutenant colonel in November 1936 and given command of the 2nd Battalion, The Welch Regiment in India.

From March to October 1938, Lomax also commanded of the Delhi Independent Brigade Area with a local rank of brigadier. He was promoted full colonel in July 1939, and was given command of 16th Infantry Brigade, taking over from Brigadier John Evetts, in Palestine, during the final stages of the Arab revolt in Palestine, with the temporary rank of brigadier.

Second World War
In September 1940, a year after the Second World War began, Lomax's brigade was sent to Egypt to join Western Desert Force. For Operation Compass in December the brigade was attached to the Indian 4th Infantry Division which had been short a brigade. They saw action in a successful attack on the Italian positions at Sidi Barrani. In mid-December the 4th Indian Division was sent to East Africa and 16th Brigade most of the ensuing period in reserve until mid February when it was withdrawn back to Egypt to join the reforming 6th Infantry Division. For his services from December 1940 to February 1941 Lomax was appointed a Commander of the Order of the British Empire.

The 16th Brigade was ordered forward in mid June 1941 as reinforcement to the forces advancing north against Vichy-controlled Syria and Lebanon. They experienced hard fighting until the Vichy surrender on 11 July.

In September, the 70th Infantry Division (the re-designated 6th Division) was shipped to Tobruk to replace the besieged 9th Australian Division. During Operation Crusader the brigade's battalions were involved in the break-out from Tobruk to link with the New Zealand Division on the night of 26 November. However, a permanent relief of Tobruk was not achieved until a week later.

In February 1942, 70th Division was ordered to India. The 16th Brigade set off in March but following the fall of Singapore, the Royal Navy's most important remaining base in the East at Trincomalee in Ceylon was felt to be under threat from the Japanese and the brigade was diverted to Ceylon where it was attached to 34th Indian Infantry Division. Lomax was appointed Fortress Commander in June 1942 and given the rank of acting Major-General in July.

In March 1943, Lomax travelled to India to take command of 26th Indian Infantry Division. He was immediately ordered to the Arakan to replace Major-General Lloyd who had incurred the Army commander's displeasure (Noel Irwin). Part of the problem had been that after an encouraging start the campaign had gone into reverse and Irwin had committed more and more brigades until Lloyd's divisional headquarters had ended up with nine brigades under command, far too many to control effectively. Finally Irwin introduced Indian XV Corps HQ under William Slim to take control. By 8 May after heavy fighting the British were back to the point they had started at the previous December but the front had been stabilised. Slim later wrote of Lomax:

In October 1943, Slim was made commander of Fourteenth Army and Lomax spent a month as an acting lieutenant general in charge of XV Corps pending the arrival of the new commander, Philip Christison. When the Japanese launched their HA-GO offensive in February 1944, Indian XV Corps had Indian 5th and 7th Infantry Divisions forward with 36th Infantry Division and Lomax's Indian 26th Infantry Division pulled back in reserve. The Japanese tactic was to infiltrate to cut off the forward divisions' line of supply and so force their capitulation. Army commander Slim had anticipated this and ordered that the forward divisions should fight where they stood and be supplied by air. Meanwhile, the reserve divisions were to fight their way forward and so crush the Japanese between them. By mid March, the 26th Indian Division, with responsibility for the eastern half of the front, had linked up with 7th Indian Division. Heavy fighting continued as XV Corps strove to take the important Maundaw-Buthidaung road. Finally, on 5 May, Lomax's division captured Point 551, the key hill, to seal the victory. Lomax's rank of Major-General was made substantive in December 1944.

In January 1945, Lomax was given the task of capturing Ramree Island. After landing two brigades on the north end of the island on 21 and 22 January, they had fought their way south to Ramree town by 9 February and resistance ceased by 17 February.

Having commanded his division for two years, Lomax was rested and saw no further action before the war came to an end.

Post-war
Returning to the UK Lomax became GOC East Anglian District. His final assignment was as President of the No.1 Commissions Board, relinquishing the appointment in August 1949 and retiring from the army the following month. In retirement he maintained his links with the army as the honorary colonel of 44th Infantry Division Signals Regiment, a territorial signals unit, from 1948 until 1950 and was Colonel of the Welch Regiment from 1949 until 1958.

Together with John de Courcy, Lomax wrote a history of the Welch Regiment for the years 1919–1951, which was published in 1952.

Personal
Lomax was married to Rene Lomax. Their son Peter Francis Napier Lomax, a pilot officer with 229 Squadron, RAF died on 24 February 1940.

References

Bibliography

External links

Generals of World War II

|-

|-
 

|-

1893 births
1973 deaths
British Army generals of World War II
British Army personnel of World War I
British military personnel of the 1936–1939 Arab revolt in Palestine
Commanders of the Order of the British Empire
Companions of the Order of the Bath
Companions of the Distinguished Service Order
Graduates of the Royal Military College, Sandhurst
People educated at Marlborough College
People from Kings Norton
Recipients of the Military Cross
Recipients of the War Cross for Military Valor
Welch Regiment officers
British Army major generals
Military personnel from Worcestershire